VfR Bürstadt is a German association football club playing out of Bürstadt, Hesse. The team was founded 1 February 1910 as SC 1910 Bürstadt and took on the name VfR on 23 August 1919. Between 1973 and 1983 they played as VfR Oli Bürstadt in recognition of sponsoring firm Otto Limburg Bürstadt-Bobstadt.

History
The club briefly rose to the highest level when playing in the Kreisliga Odenwald in 1921–22 and the Bezirksliga Main-Hessen for one season in 1932–33, but quickly disappeared back into lower-tier competition again. The club made two failed attempts (1933 and 1942) to qualify for the Gauliga Hessen (I), one of 16 regional top-flight divisions established in the 1933 reorganization of German football under the Third Reich. Following World War II, the club was reestablished and played briefly as SG Bürstadt.

Kickers enjoyed their greatest success during its sponsorship by OLI and stirred some excitement through the 1970s and 1980s as an overachieving side playing in Hesse's tier III leagues with occasional brave forays into the Regionalliga Süd (II) and 2. Bundesliga where they were the smallest club playing at that level. In 1973, they won the national amateur championship with a 3–0 victory over SC Victoria Hamburg. They made two more failed final appearances in 1976 and 1986, losing in turn to HSV Holzwickede (0–1) and BVL Remscheid (1–2 aet). VfR is one of the relatively few German clubs that have sold their naming rights to an outside sponsor, an arrangement that ended with the bankruptcy of OLI in 1982.

Their run of success ended in the 1990s with a series of poor finishes in the Amateur Oberliga Hessen (III) early in the decade. Beginning with the 1993–94 season, they bounced between the Oberliga Hessen (IV) and Landesliga Hessen-Süd (V) for nearly a decade before finally collapsing in 2002 and voluntarily accepting relegation all the way down to Bezirksliga (VII).

After a drop to the ninth tier in 2008–09 the club has recovered again and moved back up to the Gruppenliga (VII) in 2011–12, followed by promotion to the Verbandsliga in 2013. The team won the league title in the Verbandsliga in 2014 as well but, instead of accepting promotion to the Hessenliga the club withdrew to the tier eight Kreisoberliga Bergstraße instead for financial reasons.

Honours
The club's honours:

League
 German amateur championship
 Champions: 1975
 Oberliga Hessen
 Champions: 1972, 1977, 1979, 1983, 1984
 Runners-up: 1982, 1986
 Landesliga Hessen-Süd
 Champions: 2001
 Runners-up: 1997
 Verbandsliga Hessen-Süd
 Champions: 2014
 Gruppenliga Darmstadt
 Champions: 2013

Cup
 Hesse Cup
 Winners: 1975, 1977

Recent seasons
The recent season-by-season performance of the club:

 With the introduction of the Regionalligas in 1994 and the 3. Liga in 2008 as the new third tier, below the 2. Bundesliga, all leagues below dropped one tier. Also in 2008, a large number of football leagues in Hesse were renamed, with the Oberliga Hessen becoming the Hessenliga, the Landesliga becoming the Verbandsliga, the Bezirksoberliga becoming the Gruppenliga and the Bezirksliga becoming the Kreisoberliga.

References

External links
 Official website 
 The Abseits Guide to German Soccer
 Das deutsche Fußball-Archiv  historical German domestic league tables

Football clubs in Germany
Football clubs in Hesse
Association football clubs established in 1910
1910 establishments in Germany
Bergstraße (district)
2. Bundesliga clubs